Shiradi is a village on the Mangalore to Bangalore section of National Highway 75 (Old NH 48). The village is situated in Puttur taluk of Dakshina Kannada district. The nearest town is Nelliyadi which is at a distance of approximately 15 km. The ghat section of Western ghats through which NH 75 passes is called Shiradi Ghat.

Shiraadi Ghat Road 
The stretch of the National Highway passing through the Shiraadi Ghat is poorly maintained according to sources. It was upgraded by the National Highways Authority of India at a cost of  260 million. Elephants have also been sighted on the road. In 2012, the Government of Karnataka sought help from the Japanese government to bore a tunnel through the ghat. Later, the State Government released money to keep the road motorable during rains.

Shiradi Ghat will have a tunnel bypass road, the construction project will begin before December 2016. The proposed tunnel bypass road is expected to be 29 km and provides seamless travel through the ghat stretch with 6 tunnels and 10 bridges. The new project costing 12,000 crore would be executed with financial assistance from the Japan International Co-operation Agency (JICA).

Popular spots
Once you reach Shiradi, you need to travel a few hundred meters where you reach a bridge taking right there you need to start trekking to reach the spot "Ombathhu Gudda". Gundya, Kempuhole, Maranahalli, Kadamane tea estate, Heggadde, Donigal and Manjarabad Fort are the places located on the Shiradi Ghat. Aramane Betta, Venkatagiri, Mugilagiri, Are Betta and Yedakumeri are the popular trekking spots.

References

External links 

Villages in Dakshina Kannada district
Villages in Hassan district